Courtice may refer to:

 Courtice, Ontario, Canada
 Courtice (surname)
 Courtice Pounds, English actor